The 1984 Bhiwandi riot was a Hindu-Muslim riot that occurred in May 1984 in and around Bhiwandi town in Indian state of Maharashtra. It left 146 people dead and over 600 injured. On 17 May 1984, riots broke out in industrial belt from Bombay, Thane, and Bhiwandi. In all, 278 were killed and 1,118 were wounded.

References

External links
 A HORROR STORY IN INDIA: SURVIVORS TELL OF ATTACK

1984 in India
Bhiwandi
Bhiwandi riots, 1984
Bhiwandi riots, 1984
History of Maharashtra (1947–present)
May 1984 events in Asia
1984 riots
1984 murders in India